Ahmetli can refer to:

 Ahmetli
 Ahmetli, Bismil
 Ahmetli, Ergani
 Ahmetli, Erzincan
 Ahmetli, Sarayköy
 Ahmetli railway station